Gardaneh-ye Kol Hasank (also Romanized as Gardaneh-ye Kol Ḩasank) is a village in Rostam-e Yek Rural District, in the Central District of Rostam County, Fars Province, Iran. At the 2006 census, its population was 37, in 7 families.

References 

Populated places in Rostam County